Exorcist Master (驅魔道長 Jyutping: Kui moh do jeung; Pinyin: Qūmó Dàocháng; literally, Expel Demon Taoist Priest) is a 1992 Hong Kong film directed by Wu Ma and starring Wu Ma and Lam Ching-ying. It is a spin-off of the 1985 Hong Kong movie Mr. Vampire. Lam Ching-ying reprises his role as a Taoist priest.

Plot
Priest Wu (Wu Ma) is due to re-open a church after a priest died there twenty years ago, Uncle Nine (Lam Ching-ying) recommends he does not re-open the church but Priest Wu goes ahead. The priest who died there becomes a vampire who wants to turn everyone in the town into a vampire.

Cast
Lam Ching-ying as Master Chiou (Uncle Nine)
Wu Ma as Priest Wu
Collin Chou as Star (Yao-lung Chou)
Wing-Cho Yip as The Mayor
Hung Yue as Anny
Shen Yuen as Priest Shen
Chia-chun Chen as Yue Liang
Tzu-yu Yang as David

References

External links

Exorcist Master at Hong Kong Cinemagic

1992 films
Hong Kong action films
1990s monster movies
Hong Kong martial arts films
1992 action comedy films
Jiangshi films
1990s comedy horror films
Mr. Vampire
1990s Hong Kong films